Anirudra Prasad Singh (c. 1920 – September 15, 2020) was a Nepalese judge who served as 2nd Chief Justice of Nepal, in office from 21 May 1956 to 29 June 1959. He was appointed by the then-king of Nepal, Mahendra. He was also a former public service commission head and minister of law and forests.

Singh was preceded by Hari Prasad Pradhan and succeeded by Hari Prasad Pradhan.

References 

2020 deaths
Year of birth missing
Chief justices of Nepal
Men centenarians
Nepalese centenarians